Manfred Kurt Toeppen (September 3, 1887 – July 18, 1968) was an American water polo player who competed in the 1904 Summer Olympics. He was born in St. Louis, Missouri and died in Los Angeles, California. In the 1904 Olympics he won a bronze medal as a member of the Missouri Athletic Club water polo team.

References

External links
profile

1887 births
1968 deaths
American male water polo players
Olympic bronze medalists for the United States in water polo
Water polo players at the 1904 Summer Olympics
Medalists at the 1904 Summer Olympics

ru:Водное поло на летних Олимпийских играх 1904#Составы команд